Emanuel Guthi  (born 1938) is an Israeli chess master.

He played twice for Israel in Chess Olympiads.
 In 1960, at second reserve board in 14th Chess Olympiad in Leipzig (+7 –2 =4);
 In 1964, at first reserve board in 16th Chess Olympiad in Tel Aviv (+2 –4 =0).
He won the individual silver medal at Leipzig in 1960.

References

External links 

1938 births
Living people
Israeli Jews
Israeli chess players
Jewish chess players
Chess Olympiad competitors